Rudovka is a rural locality in Zhigalovsky District of Irkutsk Oblast, Russia. Population:  in 2010 it had 323 inhabitants, according to the Russian Census (2010).

Geography
The village is located on the left bank of the Lena river, about  SSE of Zhigalovo, the district administrative center.

See also
Lena-Angara Plateau

References

External links
 Zhigalovsky District - General Information (in Russian)

Rural localities in Irkutsk Oblast
Zhigalovsky District